Niyaz Gabdulkhakovich Nabeev (born March 31, 1989) is a Russian nordic combined skier who has competed since 2007. He finished 43rd in the 10 km individual large hill event at the 2010 Winter Olympics in Vancouver.

At the FIS Nordic World Ski Championships 2009 in Liberec, Nabeev finished tenth in the 4 x 5 km team and 48th in the 10 km individual large hill events.

His best World Cup finish was 8th in a 4 x 5 km team event in Oberstdorf, Germany in 2014, while his best individual finish was 28th in Kuusamo, Finland in December 2012.

References

1989 births
Living people
Nordic combined skiers at the 2010 Winter Olympics
Nordic combined skiers at the 2014 Winter Olympics
Olympic Nordic combined skiers of Russia
Russian male Nordic combined skiers
Universiade medalists in nordic combined
Universiade bronze medalists for Russia
Competitors at the 2011 Winter Universiade
Competitors at the 2015 Winter Universiade